Little Stranger may refer to:

 Little Stranger (album), a 2011 album by Annah Mac
 Little Stranger (film), a 1934 British drama film
 Little Stranger (company), a film and television production company
 The Little Stranger, a 2009 novel by Sarah Waters
 The Little Stranger (film), a 2018 film, based on the novel